This is a list of State Protected Monuments as officially reported by and available through the website of the Archaeological Survey of India in the Indian state Himachal Pradesh. The monument identifier is a combination of the abbreviation of the subdivision of the list (state, ASI circle) and the numbering as published on the website of the ASI. 5 State Protected Monuments have been recognized by the ASI in Himachal Pradesh. Besides the State Protected Monuments, also the Monuments of National Importance in this state might be relevant.

List of state protected monuments 

|}

See also 
 List of Monuments of National Importance in Himachal Pradesh
 List of State Protected Monuments in India

References 

Himachal Pradesh
State Protected Monuments
State Protected Monuments